Simitli also known as Simitliya, is a town in Blagoevgrad Province in southwestern Bulgaria. It has a population of 7,454 and is located 17 km south of Blagoevgrad. It is the seat of Simitli Municipality.

Geography

The city of Simitli lies at the crossroads for the turn to Bansko and Pirin Mountains off the Sofia-Thessaloníki E-79. Geographical locations of note are the Komatinski Cliffs between Brestovo and Sushitsa, the Kresna Gorge of the Struma River, and the foothills of the Pirin Mountains at Senokos.

Transportation
Simitli lies on E-79 which connects Sofia to the Greek Border. Simitli is also part of the Bulgarian State Railways network from Greece to Sofia. Simitli is also the intersection of E-79 and the road to Bansko and the Pirin Mountains.

Tourism
Some of the best whitewater rapids in the Balkans can be found on the Struma river in the Kresna Gorge. The rafting and kayaking season is from April to July and there is guided rafting every weekend. Simitli is also part of the EuroCup circuit for the European Rafting Federation every year. Every second weekend of January, there is a Kukeri or Surva festival held in the local stadium by E-79 which rivals Razlog and Pernik's own Kukeri Festivals.

References

External links
 www.senokos.com | Tourism website for village Senokos
 www.ternipe-simitli.org | Website for local Roma NGO that creates monthly magazine for Simitli
 www.hoteldimario.com | Website for Hotel DiMario, a local hotel in Simitli

Towns in Bulgaria
Populated places in Blagoevgrad Province
Spa towns in Bulgaria